Xenoceltites is an extinct ceratite ammonite found worldwide in the Lower Triassic. Xenoceltites belongs to the Xenoceltitidae, a taxonomic family within the ceratites that with two others now form the superfamily Xenodiscaceae.  One of the earliest ceratites, Xenoceltities has a narrow planospiral shell with a compressed whorl section, that has a suture with 2 weakly toothed lateral lobes and irregular ribbing .

References
 Arkell et al., 1957; Suborder Ceratitina in the Treatise on Invertebrate Paleontology Part L Ammonoidea; Geological Soc. of America and Univ Kansas press
 The Paleobiology Database

Paraceltitina
Triassic animals of Asia